The 1989 Miami Hurricanes football team represented the University of Miami during the 1989 NCAA Division I-A football season. It was the Hurricanes' 64th season of football. The Hurricanes were led by first-year head coach Dennis Erickson and played their home games at the Orange Bowl. They finished the season 11–1 overall. They were invited to the Sugar Bowl where they defeated Alabama, 33–25, to win the school's third national championship.

Schedule

Personnel

Roster

Coaching staff

Support staff

Rankings

Game summaries

at Wisconsin

California

at Missouri

at Michigan State

Cincinnati

San Jose State

Backup Gino Torretta, making his second consecutive start for the injured Craig Erickson, threw for a school-record 468 yards and 3 touchdowns. The Hurricanes picked up their 48th win in 49 games.

at Florida State

Prior to the Miami-Florida State game, University of Miami mascot Sebastian the Ibis was tackled by a group of police officers for attempting to put out Chief Osceola's flaming spear. Sebastian was wearing a fireman’s helmet and yellow raincoat and holding a fire extinguisher. When a police officer attempted to grab the fire extinguisher, the officer was sprayed in the chest. Sebastian was handcuffed by four officers but ultimately released. Miami quarterback Gino Torretta, who started the game in place of injured Craig Erickson, told ESPN, "Even if we weren't bad boys, it added to the mystique that, 'Man, look, even their mascot's getting arrested.'"

East Carolina

at Pittsburgh

San Diego State

Notre Dame

The Hurricanes avenged a close loss from the previous year in South Bend. This game marked the seventh time in seven attempts that Miami defeated a #1 ranked team during the 1980s.

vs. Alabama (Sugar Bowl)

1990 NFL Draft

References

Miami
Miami Hurricanes football seasons
College football national champions
Sugar Bowl champion seasons
Miami Hurricanes football